A maze is a path or collection of paths, typically from an entrance to a goal.  The word is used to refer both to branching tour puzzles through which the solver must find a route, and to simpler non-branching ("unicursal") patterns that lead unambiguously through a convoluted layout to a goal. The term "labyrinth" is generally synonymous with "maze", but can also connote specifically a unicursal pattern. The pathways and walls in a maze are typically fixed, but puzzles in which the walls and paths can change during the game are also categorised as mazes or tour puzzles.

Construction
Mazes have been built with walls and rooms, with hedges, turf, corn stalks, straw bales, books, paving stones of contrasting colors or designs, and brick, or in fields of crops such as corn or, indeed, maize. Maize mazes can be very large; they are usually only kept for one growing season, so they can be different every year, and are promoted as seasonal tourist attractions.

Indoors, mirror mazes are another form of maze, in which many of the apparent pathways are imaginary routes seen through multiple reflections in mirrors. Another type of maze consists of a set of rooms linked by doors (so a passageway is just another room in this definition). Players enter at one spot, and exit at another, or the idea may be to reach a certain spot in the maze. Mazes can also be printed or drawn on paper to be followed by a pencil or fingertip. Mazes can be built with snow.

Quality conventions for designing mazes differ according to the medium each maze is to be rendered in: Mazes to be walked by people should not reveal a closed end from a primary branch point, so that any person traversing the maze must walk further, in order to determine if a turn leads to a viable path. Mazes traced on paper typically use long, mostly parallel, convoluted routes, even for paths that are dead ends, so that a person tracing the maze has difficulty identifying dead ends while the pencil is set at a branch point.

Generation

Maze generation is the act of designing the layout of passages and walls within a maze. There are many different approaches to generating mazes, with various maze generation algorithms for building them, either by hand or automatically by computer.

There are two main mechanisms used to generate mazes. In "carving passages", one marks out the network of available routes. In building a maze by "adding walls", one lays out a set of obstructions within an open area. Most mazes drawn on paper are done by drawing the walls, with the spaces in between the markings composing the passages.

Solution

Maze solving is the act of finding a route through the maze from the start to finish. Some maze solving methods are designed to be used inside the maze by a traveler with no prior knowledge of the maze, whereas others are designed to be used by a person or computer program that can see the whole maze at once.

The mathematician Leonhard Euler was one of the first to analyze plane mazes mathematically, and in doing so made the first significant contributions to the branch of mathematics known as topology.

Mazes containing no loops are known as "standard", or "perfect" mazes, and are equivalent to a tree in graph theory. Thus many maze solving algorithms are closely related to graph theory. Intuitively, if one pulled and stretched out the paths in the maze in the proper way, the result could be made to resemble a tree.

Psychology experiments
Mazes are often used in psychology experiments to study spatial navigation and learning. Such experiments typically use rats or mice. Examples are:
 Barnes maze
 Morris water maze
 Oasis maze
 Radial arm maze
 Elevated plus maze
 T-maze

Types

Ball-in-a-maze puzzles Dexterity puzzles which involve navigating a ball through a maze or labyrinth.

Block maze A maze in which the player must complete or clear the maze pathway by positioning blocks. Blocks may slide into place or be added.

Fractal maze A maze containing holes inside which the maze is indefinitely repeated at a smaller scale.
Hamilton maze A maze in which the goal is to find the unique Hamiltonian cycle.

Linear or railroad maze A maze in which the paths are laid out like a railroad with switches and crossovers.  Solvers are constrained to moving only forward.  Often, a railroad maze will have a single track for entrance and exit.

Logic mazes These are like standard mazes except they use rules other than "don't cross the lines" to restrict motion.

Loops and traps maze A maze that features one-way doors. One must find the correct sequence of doors to escape.

Number maze A maze in which numbers are used to determine jumps that form a pathway, allowing the maze to criss-cross itself many times.

Picture maze A standard maze that forms a picture when solved.

Turf mazes and mizmazes A pattern like a long rope folded up, without any junctions or crossings.

Gallery

Publications
Numerous mazes of different kinds have been drawn, painted, published in books and periodicals, used in advertising, in software, and sold as art. In the 1970s there occurred a publishing "maze craze" in which numerous books, and some magazines, were commercially available in nationwide outlets and devoted exclusively to mazes of a complexity that was able to challenge adults as well as children (for whom simple maze puzzles have long been provided both before, during, and since the 1970s "craze").

Some of the best-selling books in the 1970s and early 1980s included those produced by Vladimir Koziakin, Rick and Glory Brightfield, Dave Phillips, Larry Evans, and Greg Bright.  Koziakin's works were predominantly of the standard two-dimensional "trace a line between the walls" variety.  The works of the Brightfields had a similar two-dimensional form but used a variety of graphics-oriented "path obscuring" techniques. Although the routing was comparable to or simpler than Koziakin's mazes, the Brightfields' mazes did not allow the various pathway options to be discerned easily by the roving eye as it glanced about.

Greg Bright's works went beyond the standard published forms of the time by including "weave" mazes in which illustrated pathways can cross over and under each other. Bright's works also offered examples of extremely complex patterns of routing and optical illusions for the solver to work through.  What Bright termed "mutually accessible centers" (The Great Maze Book, 1973) also called "braid" mazes, allowed a proliferation of paths flowing in spiral patterns from a central nexus and, rather than relying on "dead ends" to hinder progress, instead relied on an overabundance of pathway choices.  Rather than have a single solution to the maze, Bright's routing often offered multiple equally valid routes from start to finish, with no loss of complexity or diminishment of solver difficulties because the result was that it became difficult for a solver to definitively "rule out" a particular pathway as unproductive.  Some of Bright's innovative mazes had no "dead ends", although some clearly had looping sections (or "islands") that would cause careless explorers to keep looping back again and again to pathways they had already travelled.

The books of Larry Evans focused on 3-D structures, often with realistic perspective and architectural themes, and Bernard Myers (Supermazes No. 1) produced similar illustrations.  Both Greg Bright (The Hole Maze Book) and Dave Phillips (The World's Most Difficult Maze) published maze books in which the sides of pages could be crossed over and in which holes could allow the pathways to cross from one page to another, and one side of a page to the other, thus enhancing the 3-D routing capacity of 2-D printed illustrations.

Adrian Fisher is both the most prolific contemporary author on mazes, and also one of the leading maze designers. His book The Amazing Book of Mazes (2006) contains examples and photographs of numerous methods of maze construction, several of which have been pioneered by Fisher; The Art of the Maze (Weidenfeld & Nicolson, 1990) contains a substantial history of the subject, whilst Mazes and Labyrinths (Shire Publications, 2004) is a useful introduction to the subject.

A recent book by Galen Wadzinski (The Ultimate Maze Book) offers formalized rules for more recent innovations that involve single-directional pathways, 3-D simulating illustrations, "key" and "ordered stop" mazes in which items must be collected or visited in particular orders to add to the difficulties of routing (such restrictions on pathway traveling and re-use are important in a printed book in which the limited amount of space on a printed page would otherwise place clear limits on the number of choices and pathways that can be contained within a single maze).  Although these innovations are not all entirely new with Wadzinski, the book marks a significant advancement in published maze puzzles, offering expansions on the traditional puzzles that seem to have been fully informed by various video game innovations and designs, and adds new levels of challenge and complexity in both the design and the goals offered to the puzzle-solver in a printed format.

Public attractions

Asia

Dubai
 Gardens Shopping Mall, Dubai (world's largest indoor maze)
India

 Bhulbhulayia

Japan
 Hikimi no Meiro, Kiso, Nagano, Japan
 Kyodai Meiro Palladium, Nikkō, Tochigi, Japan
 Sendai Hi-Land, Sendai, Miyagi, Japan
 Shirahama Energy Land, Shirahama, Wakayama, Japan

Pacific

New Zealand
 Amazing Maze n' Maize
 The Great Maze at Puzzling World

Europe

Austria
 Schönbrunn Palace, Vienna, has a large hedge maze in its gardens.
Swarovski Crystal World, Wattens, Tyrol, has a hand-shaped hedge maze in its gardens.

Belgium
 Loppem Castle maze

Czech republic
 Obludiste , Dolni Pena (Jindrichuv Hradec) - hedge maze 6.000 m2

Denmark
 Samsø Labyrinten (The world's largest permanent maze, 60.000 m2)

Germany
 Hortus Vitalis – Der Irrgarten, Bad Salzuflen (hedge maze)

Greece
 Labyrinth Park near Hersonissos, Crete (extends to approximately 1.300 m2)

Italy
 Castello di Masino, Caravino 10010, Torino, Italia
 , Chiusi, Tuscany (see Pliny's Italian labyrinth)
 Villa Pisani, Stra, near Venice
 The labyrinth of Franco Maria Ricci at Fontanellato

Netherlands
 Waterlabyrinth, Nijmegen, designed by Klaus van de Locht, 1981
 Doolhof Ruurlo, Ruurlo, designed by Daniel Marot, based on the design for Hampton Court Maze

Portugal
 Parque do Arnado, Ponte de Lima, District of Viana do Castelo
 Parque de São Roque, District of Porto
 Forest Reserve of Pinhal da Paz, São Miguel Island, Azores

Spain
 Alcázar of Seville, Seville
 Corn Laberynth in the Camino de Santiago, León
 Parc del laberint d'Horta, Barcelona,
 Parc de la Torreblanca, Esplugues de Llobregat
 Parque de El Capricho, Madrid
 Laberinto de Villapresente, Cantabria. With 5,625qm, it is the largest maze in Spain.
 Parque de Tentegorra, Murcia
 Royal Palace of La Granja de San Ildefonso, Segovia

United Kingdom

 Blake House Craft Centre, Braintree, Essex, England (Open July–September)
 Carnfunnock Country Park, Northern Ireland. A hedge maze in the shape of Northern Ireland and winner of 1985 Design a Maze competition.
 Castlewellan, Northern Ireland, world's largest permanent hedge maze
 Chatsworth House garden maze, planted with 1,209 yews.
 Cliveden House Originally laid out in 1894, the maze was restored and re-opened to the public in 2011, consisting of 1100 Yew trees.
 Crystal Palace Park, South London. Laid out in the 1870s, this is the largest maze in London.
Glendurgan Garden, Cornwall.  A cherry laurel hedge maze created in 1833.
 Hampton Court Maze. A famous historic maze in the Palace gardens.
 Hever Castle Maze, Hever, Kent. Yew tree maze and a splashing water maze
 Hoo Hill Maze, Shefford, Bedfordshire, England
 Norwich Cathedral, Norfolk, England. A labyrinth in the Cloister Garth. Laid to commemorate the Golden Jubilee of HM Queen Elizabeth II in 2002.
 Richings Park Amazing Maize Maze, Richings Park, near Heathrow, England (Open July–September)
 Saffron Walden, an Essex town with its historic Bridge End Gardens hedge maze and the England's largest turf maze
 Saltwell Park, Gateshead, Tyne and Wear, England. A yew-tree maze restored to its original condition in 2005 and open to the public during park opening hours.
 Somerleyton Hall, Suffolk, England. A yew hedge maze designed and planted in 1846 by William Nesfield.
Traquair House, Peeblesshire, Scotland. A beech tree hedge maze designed by John Schofield.
 York Maze, near RAF Elvington, with a different design each year

North America

Canada
In 2012, the Kraay Family Farm in Alberta, Canada created the world's largest QR code in the form of a massive corn maze, popularly known as The Edmonton Corn Maze.

United States

The Stanley Hotel in Estes Park, Colorado in 2015 installed a 10,100-square-foot hedge maze on its front lawn, using 1,600 to 2,000 Alpine Currant hedge bushes.  Previously the hotel had no maze, though one was featured prominently in the 1980 film adaption of Stephen King's novel The Shining, which is set at the hotel.
 Dole Pineapple Plantation, Oahu.
 Tanglewood Music Center Hedge Maze, Lenox and Stockbridge, Massachusetts.
Mazes are a popular attraction at Renaissance Festivals across the United States.
 The Wooz was a maze attraction opened in 1988 in Vacaville, California by Sun Creative System, a Japanese company that had seen success with the concept in Japan. Despite initial interest, high admission cost and hot summers led the park to close in 1992. The failure of the Wooz scuttled Sun Creative System’s plans for additional maze attractions in the U.S.

South Africa

Chartwell Castle in Johannesburg claims to have the biggest known uninterrupted hedgerow maze in the Southern world, with over 900 conifers. It covers about 6000 sq.m. (approximately 1.5 acres), which is around 5 times bigger than The Hampton Court Maze. The center is about 12m × 12m. The maze was designed and laid out by Conrad Penny.

South America

Brazil
 Labirinto Verde, Nova Petrópolis, (Circular hedge maze built in 1989; Latitude 29°22'32.71"S Longitude 51°06'43.68"W)

In popular culture

Television
 Both Nubeluz and American Gladiators, from Peru and the United States respectively, featured a giant life-size maze used in competition. The object on both programs was for the contestants to find their way from the entrance to the exit as quickly as possible. On Nubeluz, the contestants took turns running through the maze and had a maximum of 1 minute to reach the exit; on American Gladiators, both contestants ran through the maze simultaneously and were given 45 seconds to find the correct solution. The giant maze was part of the game rotation on both programs concurrently, and was also retired from both programs simultaneously.

The Shining
 The film adaptation of Stephen King's 1977 novel, The Shining (1980), includes a harrowing scene featuring Jack Torrance and Danny Torrance in an ominous hedge maze.

See also
 Celtic maze
 Crop circle
 Stone labyrinths of Bolshoi Zayatsky Island

References

Further reading

 Ettore Selli, "Labirinti Vegetali, la guida completa alle architetture verdi dei cinque continenti", Ed. Pendragon, 2020; ISBN 9788833642222
 
 
 
 
  The definitive guide to British Mazes.
 
  Includes

External links

Labyrinth Society official web page

 
Garden features
Puzzles